Darshaan (18 April 1981 – 21 May 2001) was a British-bred, French-trained Thoroughbred racehorse and a Champion sire and broodmare sire.

Background
Darshaan was a brown horse bred by his owner Aga Khan IV. He was sired by the British stallion Shirley Heights, winner of the 1978 Epsom Derby and the last Epsom Derby winner to be both the son of a previous winner, Mill Reef (1971), and the sire of a subsequent winner, Slip Anchor (1985). Darshaan's dam Delsy, was a daughter of the 1961 Grand Critérium winner, Abdos. She also produced Darara who won the Prix Vermeille and became a very successful broodmare.

Racing career
Trained by Alain de Royer-Dupré, Darshaan was ridden by Yves Saint-Martin in all his races. As a two-year-old in 1983, he won the Group 1 Critérium de Saint-Cloud, setting a race record time of 2:07.40 for 2,000 metres that still stood going into 2010. At age three, Darshaan won the Prix Hocquart, Prix Greffulhe, and the French Classic, the Prix du Jockey Club. In the International Classification for 1984, he was the highest rated French-trained three-year-old, and the third highest-rated three-year-old in Europe behind El Gran Senor and Chief Singer.

Champion sire
Darshaan was an outstanding sire who stood at stud at the Aga Khan's Gilltown Stud farm, in County Kildare, Ireland. In 1999, he was described as the foremost active broodmare sire in Europe. His 2000 fee was Irpounds 50,000. The leading sire in France in 2003, among his progeny were:

 Hellenic (b. 1987) – won G1 Yorkshire Oaks
 Kotashaan (b. 1988) – winner of five Group 1 races in the United States including the Breeders' Cup Turf and San Juan Capistrano Handicap;
 Key Change (b. 1993) – won G1 Yorkshire Oaks;
 Mark of Esteem (b. 1993) – won the British Classic 2,000 Guineas Stakes, and G1 Queen Elizabeth II Stakes;
 Mutamam (b. 1995) – won G1 Canadian International;
 Cerulean Sky (b. 1996) – won G1 Prix Saint-Alary;
 Dilshaan (b. 1998) – won G1 Racing Post Trophy; 
 Olden Times (b. 1998) – won G1 Prix Jean Prat;
 Dalakhani (b. 2000) – the 2003 European Horse of the Year. Wins included the Prix du Jockey Club and the Prix de l'Arc de Triomphe;
 Mezzo Soprano (b. 2000) – won G1 Prix Vermeille;
 Necklace (b. 2001) – won G1 Moyglare Stud Stakes.

Champion broodmare sire
Darshaan daughters made him the leading broodmare sire in Great Britain & Ireland in 2002. He was the damsire of Group 1 winners:
 Ebadiyla (b. 1994) – winner of the 1997 Prix Royal-Oak and Irish Oaks;
 Zainta (b. 1995), winner of the French Classic, Prix de Diane (1998);
 Enzeli (b. 1995), winner of the 1999 Ascot Gold Cup;
 Sendawar (b. 1996), winner of the 1999 Poule d'Essai des Poulains;
 Edabiya (b. 1996), won the 1998 Moyglare Stud Stakes;
 Marienbard (b. 1997) – won Prix de l'Arc de Triomphe;
 High Chaparral (b. 1999) – won Epsom Derby (2002), Irish Derby Stakes (2002), Breeders' Cup Turf (2002, 2003);
 Islington (b. 1999) – won Nassau Stakes (2002), Yorkshire Oaks (2002, 2002), Breeders' Cup Filly & Mare Turf (2003)
 Alexander Goldrun (b.2001) – won Prix de l'Opéra (2004), Hong Kong Cup (2004), Pretty Polly Stakes (2004, 2005), Nassau Stakes (2005)
 Darsi (b. 2003), winner of the 2006 Prix du Jockey Club;
 Sarafina (b. 2007), winner of 2011 Grand Prix de Saint-Cloud, 2010 Prix de Diane, 2010 Prix Saint-Alary ;
 Al Kazeem (b. 2008), winner of the 2013 Prince of Wales's Stakes;
 Estimate (b. 2009), winner of the 2013 Ascot Gold Cup;
 Ridasiyna (b. 2009), winner of the 2012 Prix de l'Opéra Longines

In 2000, Darshaan underwent an emergency operation for colic. At age twenty, he died at Gilltown Stud on 21 May 2001.

Pedigree

References

 Darshaan's pedigree, racing statistics, and progeny at the Aga Khan Studs website

1981 racehorse births
2001 racehorse deaths
Racehorses bred in France
Racehorses trained in France
French Thoroughbred Classic Race winners
French Champion racehorses
British Champion Thoroughbred broodmare sires
Thoroughbred family 13-c